Parsonage Wood is a  biological Site of Special Scientific Interest south-east of Cranbrook in Kent. It is owned and managed by the Kent Wildlife Trust.

This is an example of a woodland ghyll in the High Weald. The trees are mainly coppiced, but some of the ground flora are species which are indicative of ancient woods, such as butcher's broom, violet helleborine and pendulous sedge.

There is access from a footpath which runs north from Scullsgate House.

References

Kent Wildlife Trust
Sites of Special Scientific Interest in Kent
Forests and woodlands of Kent